Hytner is a surname. Notable people with the surname include:

 Benet Hytner (1927–2023), former Judge of Appeal of the Isle of Man
 Joyce Hytner (born 1935), British theatrical fundraiser
 Nicholas Hytner (born 1956), English theatre, film, and opera director
 Steve Hytner (born 1959), American actor